The Sierra Leonan records in swimming are the fastest ever performances of swimmers from Sierra Leone, which are recognised and ratified by the Sierra Leone Amateur Swimming, Diving and Water Polo Association.

All records were set in finals unless noted otherwise.

Long Course (50 m)

Men

Women

Short Course (25 m)

Men

Women

References

Sierra Leone
Records
Swimming